General Muhammad Shariff  (22 February 1921 – 6 August 1999) was a senior Pakistan Army general who was the first Chairman of Joint Chiefs of Staff Committee, serving in this post from 1976 until tendering his resignation in 1977 over the disagreement with the military takeover of the civilian government by the Pakistani military.

Biography

Muhammad Shariff was born on 22 February 1921 into a Punjabi family in Lahore, Punjab in India. After being educated at the Lawrence College in Murree, Shariff was commissioned in the 3rd infantry battalion of the 2nd Punjab Regiment of the British Indian Army in 1942. 2nd-Lt. Shariff saw actions in the Burma front during World War II with the British Indian Army.

After the partition of India in 1947, Captain Shariff moved to join the newly formed Pakistan Army where his career progressed extremely well, having attended and graduated from the Imperial Defence College. In 1952, Major Shariff was promoted as a lieutenant-colonel and qualified as psc from the Command and Staff College in Quetta; he later achieved promotion to Brigadier in 1959.

In 1960, Brig. Shariff played a crucial role when he commanded the tactical strike brigade to remove the Nawab of Dir and Khan of Jandol to prevent secession from Khyber-Pakhtunkhwa, Pakistan.

In 1964–66, Brig. Shariff moved to the staff assignment at the Army GHQ, serving in the Corps of Education where he served on the army board to select the potential candidates to be educated at the Royal Military Academy Sandhurst. In 1966, Major-General Shariff was appointed as the Inspector General Training and Evaluation (IGT&E) at the Army GHQ, and later appointed as the Commandant of the Command and Staff College in Quetta, which he served until 1970.

In 1970, Maj-Gen. Shariff was promoted to the three-star rank in the army, and took over the diplomatic assignment as opposed to the command assignment. Lieutenant-General Shariff was posted as the permanent representative at the CENTO's HQ in Ankara, Turkey, which he remained until 1971.

On 12 December 1971, Lt-Gen. Shariff returned to Pakistan and partially took over the command of the 33rd Infantry Division, stationed in Quetta, from its GOC, Maj-Gen. Naseer Ahmad, who was wounded in action against the Indian Army. After inspecting the infantry division, Lt-Gen. Shariff eventually handed over the command of the 33rd Infantry Division to then Maj-Gen. Iqbal Khan and departed to Turkey.

In 1972, Lt-Gen. Shariff was appointed as field commander of the II Corps, stationed in Multan. During this time, Lt-Gen. Shariff played a crucial role in his role as a secondment when he led his II Corps to provide the military aid to the civil power to maintain law and order in Karachi, amid the labour unrest. In 1974, Lt-Gen, Shariff was appointed as an honorary Colonel commandant of the Punjab Regiment.

Chairman Joint Chiefs of Staff Committee

In 1976, General Tikka Khan's retirement as a chief of army staff was due, and Lt-Gen. Shariff was the most senior army general in the Pakistani military. Initially, Lt-Gen, Shariff was in the race for the promotion to four-star rank alongside six other army generals.

Eventually, Prime Minister Zulfikar Ali Bhutto promoted and elevated the junior-most Lt-Gen, Zia-ul-Haq, to the four-star appointment and appointed him as nation's second army chief in 1976. Prime Minister Bhutto moved to create the Joint Chiefs of Staff Committee and promoted Lt-Gen. Shariff to the four-star rank, posting him as first Chairman Joint Chiefs of Staff Committee on 1 March 1976.

His relations with Gen. Zia were limited  but he seemed to dislike General Zia personally. In 1974–75, Lt-Gen. Shariff had submitted a report to the then-army chief General Tikka Khan that detailed Maj-Gen. Zia's actions of bypassing the chain of command in the military but the report was overshadowed due to Zia's dedication towards promoting the professionalism in the military. His duties as Chairman Joint Chiefs had been largely ineffective, and his deputy Admiral M.S. Khan had led the delegation to meet with Vice Chairman Li Xiannian when he paid a state visit to Pakistan on 22 January 1977.

His relations with Gen. Zia soured and he was not supportive towards the actions by General Zia of military takeover of the civilian government, and regretted that this ultimate step had become inevitable. In July 1977, General Shariff prematurely sought retirement and he submitted his resignation to the President of Pakistan, asking him to relieve him of his duty.

In public circles, General Shariff privately made it clear that the martial law was in fact unconstitutional. Furthermore, General Shariff was of the view of strengthening the Chairman joint chiefs' role to be more assertive and with more power than the army chief, but before the system could evolve itself, the July 1977 coup disturbed the power balance, and tilted it heavily in favor of the army chief.

In 1977, General Shariff left the chairmanship of the joint chiefs to his deputy Admiral Mohammad Shariff but it was not until 1979 when his resignation actually became effective. He died in Lahore on 6 August 1999.

Awards and decorations

Foreign decorations

References

External links
Obituary of General Muhammad Shariff

 

1921 births
1999 deaths
Punjabi people
People from Lahore
Lawrence College Ghora Gali alumni
Punjab Regiment officers
British Indian Army officers
Indian people of World War II
Graduates of the Royal College of Defence Studies
Pakistani expatriates in Turkey
Pakistani diplomats
Pakistani generals
Chairmen Joint Chiefs of Staff Committee
Pakistani democracy activists